Jillian Bach (born April 27, 1973) is an American actress. She is best known for her role as Irene in the ABC sitcom Two Guys and a Girl. She was also series regular on the CBS sitcom Courting Alex. 

She also guest starred in the television series Felicity, The X-Files, Party of Five, Gilmore Girls, Grey's Anatomy, The King of Queens, Law & Order, NCIS, Bones and Private Practice, as well as appearing recurringly on ER  and The Mentalist.

She also co-starred in the films The Uninvited and Julie & Julia.

Filmography

References

External links

1973 births
Living people
20th-century American actresses
21st-century American actresses
Actresses from Florida
American film actresses
American television actresses
People from Palm Beach Gardens, Florida